USS Charles H. Roan, named after Charles H. Roan, a US Marine, may refer to:

, a Gearing-class destroyer.
, a cancelled Gearing-class destroyer.

United States Navy ship names